Willo is a given name. Notable people with the name include:

Willo Davis Roberts (1928–2004), American writer of children's novels
Willo Flood (born 1985), Irish footballer
Willo McDonagh (born 1983), Irish footballer

See also
Willo the Wisp, British cartoon series originally produced in 1981
Willo, a specimen of the dinosaur Thescelosaurus falsely thought to have had a fossilised heart.